The Women's Points Race was one of the 6 women's events at the 2002 UCI Track Cycling World Championships, held in Copenhagen, Denmark.

20 Cyclists from 20 countries participated in the race. Because of the number of entries, there were no qualification rounds for this discipline. Consequently, the event was run direct to the final.

Final
The Final and only race was run at 26:25 on September 28. The competition consisted on 100 laps, making a total of 25 km with 10 sprints.

Elapsed Time=33:51.700
Average Speed=44.297 km/h

References

Women's points race
UCI Track Cycling World Championships – Women's points race
UCI